Miss World 1991, the 41st edition of the Miss World pageant, was held on 28 December 1991 at the Georgia World Congress Center in Atlanta, Georgia, United States. The winner was Ninibeth Leal representing Venezuela. She was crowned by Gina Tolleson of the United States. Miss World 1991 was scheduled to be held in the Dominican Republic. Due to scheduling difficulties, Miss World was first moved to Puerto Rico, then to Atlanta, United States. Preliminary swimsuits in Miss World 1991 were held in South Africa.  It was the first time the Miss World pageant was held in North America. This is the fourth time that Venezuela to win Miss World.

Results

Placements

Continental Queens of Beauty

Contestants

Judges

 Mike Favre
 Brenda McLain
 Phil Hayes
 Marie DeGeorge
 Eric Morley † 
 Jarvis Astaire † 
 Paul Block
 Jane Ambrose
 Edgar Botero

Notes

Debuts

Returns
Last competed in 1977:
  – returned after the Miss World Organization decided to lift a 14-year apartheid rule, allowing its contestants to compete.

Last competed in 1986:
 
Last competed in 1988:
 
 
Last competed in 1989:

Withdrawals
  - Unable to compete just days before the finals due to Illness
 
  - Muriel Edoukou - Due lack of Sponsorship.
  - Tracy Ann D'Abreu - Due to the controversy over her victory and citizenship, she was declared ineligible to compete at Miss World 1991.
   - Renewed its franchise, however it happened three months after Miss World.
  - Did not send delegates to Miss World after 1990 until it returned in 2009.
 
  – Due to problems with their franchise and lack of sponsorship
  – Due to scheduling conflict
  - The winner of Miss USSR 1991, Ilmira Shamsutdinova was invited to compete in Miss World 1991, however she rejected the invitation because was too underage for the contest. No runners-up from Miss USSR 1991 pageant were sent for Miss World 1991. The USSR ceased to exist only two days before the Miss World pageant. However 5 years later, Shamsutdinova competed at Miss Universe 1996

Replacements
  – Antonia Balint - She was Dethroned of her Miss Hungary 1991 crown after Hungarian newspapers printed photographs that she had previously appeared in the men's magazine Lui and other publications against Miss World rules. Her 1st -runner up, Timea Raba couldn't replace her for the same reason.
  – Lu Shu-Fang.

Other Notes
  Michelle McLean she went to compete in Miss Universe in 1992 it was held in Bangkok and then she won the crown.She competed in just only 4 months before she went on to compete in Miss Universe.

References

External links
 Pageantopolis – Miss World 1991

Miss World
1991 in the United States
1991 beauty pageants
Beauty pageants in the United States
1991 in Georgia (U.S. state)
December 1991 events in the United States